Kyrgyzstan participated in the 2010 Summer Youth Olympics in Singapore.

Medalists

Boxing

Boys

Canoeing

Boys

Judo

Individual

Team

Modern pentathlon

Swimming

Wrestling

Greco-Roman

References

External links
Competitors List: Kyrgyzstan

2010 in Kyrgyzstani sport
Nations at the 2010 Summer Youth Olympics
Kyrgyzstan at the Youth Olympics